Butter pecan is a flavor, prominent especially in the United States, in ice cream,  cakes, and cookies. Roasted pecans, butter, and vanilla flavor are used in butter pecan baked goods. Butter pecan ice cream is smooth vanilla ice cream with a slight buttery flavor, with pecans added. It is manufactured by many major ice cream brands. A variant of the recipe is butter almond, which replaces the pecans with almonds.

Butter pecan is a popular flavor of ice cream produced by many companies and is also one of the thirty-one flavors of Baskin Robbins.

See also

 List of cookies
 List of ice cream flavors

References

Flavors of ice cream
Vanilla ice cream
Cookies
Foods featuring butter
Butter pecan